Cassian Cary Elwes (born 7 August 1959) is a British independent film producer and talent agent.

Early life and education
Cassian Elwes was born on 7 August 1959 in London, England. He is the son of Dominic Elwes, a portrait painter, and Tessa Kennedy, an interior designer. He is the elder brother of actor Cary Elwes and artist Damian Elwes. He is the stepson of Elliott Kastner, an American film producer.

Career
Elwes began his producing career with 1984's Oxford Blues starring Rob Lowe and Ally Sheedy and has enjoyed continuing success in film.  His earlier roles include Men at Work with Emilio Estevez and Charlie Sheen, The Chase with Charlie Sheen, Kristy Swanson, and Henry Rollins, and The Dark Backward with Judd Nelson, Bill Paxton, and Rob Lowe. In 1989 he produced the independent film Never on Tuesday which featured a cast of cameos including Charlie Sheen, Emilio Estevez, Judd Nelson, Nicolas Cage, and Cary Elwes.
 
The Hollywood Reporter has said that Elwes was "involved in a virtual who's who of every great independent film of the last ten years" with films such as Thank You for Smoking, Half Nelson, and Frozen River (the last two of which garnered Oscar nominations for Ryan Gosling and Melissa Leo respectively).

"What people lose sight of," Elwes said to Screen International, "is that these films cost a tenth of the films that they competed against at the Academy Awards. The privilege was the recognition."
 
Elwes is an expert in the field of arranging financing and distribution for independent films having done so for 283 films during his tenure at William Morris Independent.
 
Since leaving William Morris Independent, Elwes has been involved in arranging financing and distribution for 23 films including Lawless, directed by John Hillcoat, (The Road), starring Shia LaBeouf and Tom Hardy, and the thriller The Paperboy, directed by Lee Daniels (Precious), starring Matthew McConaughey and Zac Efron. Elwes produced the period drama The Butler, which was directed by Lee Daniels and featured an ensemble cast, including Forest Whitaker, Oprah Winfrey, John Cusack, Jane Fonda, Terrence Howard, Vanessa Redgrave, Alan Rickman, Liev Schreiber, and Robin Williams, among others.

Additionally, he produced Dallas Buyers Club starring Matthew McConaughey and Jennifer Garner, Ain't Them Bodies Saints starring Rooney Mara, Casey Affleck and Ben Foster, and Hateship, Loveship starring Kristen Wiig, Guy Pearce, Hailee Steinfeld and Nick Nolte.

On 29 October 2013, Elwes launched the Cassian Elwes Independent Screenwriter Fellowship, in conjunction with The Black List, to award one writer an all-expenses-paid trip to the 2014 Sundance Film Festival and mentorship from Elwes. Elwes and The Black List plan to award the fellowship annually.

William Morris years
From 1994 to 2009, he co-headed William Morris Independent as an agent at The William Morris Agency, representing independent films and independent film producers; a position he held until the merger of that agency with Endeavor.

Filmography

Ancestry

References

External links

1959 births
Living people
Businesspeople from London
English expatriates in the United States
English film producers
English people of Croatian-Jewish descent
English people of Serbian descent
People from Greater Los Angeles